was a Japanese artist, in the words of art historian Timothy Clarke, "an individualist and an independent, perhaps the last virtuoso in traditional Japanese painting".

Biography 
Living through the Edo period to the Meiji period, Kyōsai witnessed Japan transform itself from a feudal country into a modern state. Born at Koga, he was the son of a samurai. His first aesthetic shock was at the age of nine when he picked up a human head separated from a corpse in the Kanda river. After working for a short time as a boy with ukiyo-e artist Utagawa Kuniyoshi, he received his formal artistic training in the Kanō school under Maemura Tōwa (前村洞和, ? – 1841), who gave him the nickname "The Painting Demon", but Kyōsai soon abandoned the formal traditions for the greater freedom of the popular school. During the political ferment which produced and followed the revolution of 1867, Kyōsai attained a reputation as a caricaturist. His very long painting on makimono (a horizontal type of Japanese handscroll/scroll) "The battle of the farts" may be seen as a caricature of this ferment. He was arrested three times and imprisoned by the authorities of the shogunate. Soon after the assumption of effective power by the Emperor, a great congress of painters and men of letters was held at which Kyōsai was present. He again expressed his opinion of the new movement in a caricature, which had a great popular success, but also brought him into the hands of the police, this time of the opposite party.

Kyōsai is considered by many to be the greatest successor of Hokusai (of whom, however, he was not a pupil), as well as the first political caricaturist of Japan. His work mirrored his life in its wild and undisciplined nature, and occasionally reflected his love of drink. Although he did not possess Hokusai's dignity, power or reticence, he compensated with a fantastic exuberance, which always lent interest to his technically excellent draughtsmanship.

He created what is considered to be the first manga magazine in 1874: Eshinbun Nipponchi, with Kanagaki Robun. The magazine was heavily influenced by Japan Punch, founded in 1862 by Charles Wirgman, a British cartoonist. Eshinbun Nipponchi had a very simple style of drawings and did not become popular with many people, and ended after just three issues.

In addition to his caricatures, Kyōsai painted a large number of pictures and sketches, often choosing subjects from the folklore of his country, Nô drama, nature and religion, for example The Temptation of Shaka Niorai or The goddess Kwannon on a dragon (on kakejiku frame) A fine collection of these works is preserved in the British Museum; and there are also good examples in the National Art Library at South Kensington and the Guimet Museum at Paris. The Kawanabe Kyōsai Memorial Museum was established in 1977, located at Warabi, Saitama Prefecture, Japan.

Erwin Bälz wrote in his diary that Kyosai died because of gastric cancer.

A crater on Mercury has been named in his honor.

Bibliography
The most important work about Kyōsai's art and life was written by himself: Kyōsai Gadan (暁斎画談), or "Kyōsai's Treatise on Painting", half autobiography and half painting manual. An important contemporary work concerning the artist is Kawanabe Kyōsai-ō den (河鍋暁斎翁伝), or "Biography of the Old Man Kawanabe Kyōsai", by Iijima Kyoshin (飯島虚心). The work was finished in 1899, but published only in 1984.

Many westerners came to visit Kyōsai, and their memoirs about the artist are valuable. The two important ones, both rare, are:
 Émile Étienne Guimet, Promenades japonaises, Paris, 1880
 Josiah Conder, Paintings and Studies by Kawanabe Kyōsai, Tokyo, 1911. Conder was a serious student of Japanese art; after some initial rejections, he was accepted as Kyōsai's pupil, and accompanied him for ten years until the master's death.

The most updated, and easily available, reference to Kyōsai's life and works in English is:
Timothy Clark, Demon of painting: the art of Kawanabe Kyōsai, London: Published for the Trustees of the British Museum by the British Museum Press, 1993

References

External links

 

1831 births
1889 deaths
Ukiyo-e artists
19th-century Japanese people
19th-century Japanese painters
Buddhist artists